Sørdomen (The Southern Dome) is an ice dome of Austfonna at Nordaustlandet, Svalbard. The glacier cap of Austfonna has two significant ice domes, Sørdomen and Norddomen further north. The part of Austfonna west of Sørdomen is called Palanderisen.

References

Glaciers of Svalbard
Nordaustlandet